Douglas McMackin Harrington (October 1, 1966 – November 14, 2006) was an American heavy metal guitarist. He was best known for being one of the lead guitarists for the thrash metal band Defiance throughout their entire recording career.

Biography
Harrington was born October 1, 1966, in Massachusetts, and moved in his early childhood to Oakland, California, where he was raised. He joined Defiance in 1984, left in 1985 and rejoined again the same year in a turn of events where he and his replacement Jim Adams ended up sharing the lead guitar position. Harrington was an integral member of Defiance as soon as he joined the band, composing the bulk of the band's music on all three of their albums, Product of Society, Void Terra Firma and Beyond Recognition.

Around 1993, Defiance folded and Harrington, along with his former bandmates Jim Adams and bassist Mike Kaufmann formed a new band, Inner Threshold, with ex-Heathen vocalist Dave White. This band played a more groove-oriented traditional metal style. After the departure of Adams and White, Harrington and Kaufmann formed Under, which also eventually folded after an EP.

Harrington married his wife Adrianne in May 1996. Their daughter Grace was born on August 25, 2002. No longer a professional musician, Harrington went back to school and went into marketing and sales. He played in a cover band called Fat Freddie's Cat which also featured Dave White, Mike Kaufmann and Jim Adams.

Defiance reunited in 2004 with Harrington, Adams, Kaufmann, vocalist Steev Esquivel, and new drummer James Raymond (later replaced by Mark Hernandez), but at the time Harrington was secretly battling cancer. He spent the last few years of his life recording and writing for the new Defiance album, but died in late 2006. The remaining four members of Defiance have carried on as Harrington requested and their last album was dedicated to him. A park bench at Montclair part in Oakland, California was also dedicated to Harrington.

Harrington is survived by his wife, daughter, brother Adam Harrington, sister Reva Kidd, his father Sherwood Harrington and his stepmother, Diane Harrington.

1966 births
2006 deaths
Deaths from cancer in California
American heavy metal guitarists
20th-century American guitarists
American male guitarists
Defiance (band) members
20th-century American male musicians